Mercy Cross High School was a private, Roman Catholic high school in Biloxi, Mississippi, founded in 1981. It was the merger of two other high schools in Biloxi, Sacred Heart High School and Notre Dame High School. Sacred Heart was the all-girls school while Notre Dame was the all-boys school. Mercy Cross was the co-ed merger of the two. The name, Mercy Cross, was derived from the Sisters of Mercy and the Brothers of the Holy Cross, who taught students at schools in the Roman Catholic Diocese of Biloxi for decades. Feeder schools included Nativity of the Blessed Virgin Mary Elementary, Our Lady of Fatima Elementary, Sacred Heart Elementary, and St. Alphonsus Elementary.

The school was located on the original Notre Dame High School campus in Biloxi, Mississippi and nestled between Keegan's Bayou to the east and the Biloxi sewage treatment plant to the west.

After receiving extensive damage from Hurricane Katrina in 2005, classes were temporarily relocated while construction began on a new school. It was permanently replaced by St. Patrick Catholic High School in Biloxi in August 2007. St. Patrick Catholic High School is the merger of Mercy Cross High School and St. John High School of Gulfport, Mississippi.

Notes and references

Buildings and structures in Biloxi, Mississippi
Defunct Catholic secondary schools in the United States
Defunct schools in Mississippi
Educational institutions disestablished in 2007
Roman Catholic Diocese of Biloxi
Schools in Harrison County, Mississippi